Salvia macrophylla is a perennial undershrub native to Colombia, Peru, and Bolivia.

The leaves have many glands, and are sticky and aromatic.

Notes

External links
IPNI Plant Names Index

macrophylla
Flora of Colombia